The Journal of Nutritional Biochemistry is a monthly peer-reviewed scientific journal covering biochemical and molecular biological aspects of nutrition science. The journal was established in 1970 as Nutrition Reports International and obtained its current title in 1990, with volume numbering restarting at 1. It is published by Elsevier and the editor-in-chief is Bernhard Hennig (University of Kentucky).

Abstracting and indexing 
The journal is abstracted and indexed in:

References

External links 
 

Nutrition and dietetics journals
Elsevier academic journals
Publications established in 1990
Monthly journals
Biochemistry journals
English-language journals